The 464th Chemical Brigade was a chemical unit in the United States Army Reserve from February 1972 until September 2008.

Mission
To provide command and control of two to six chemical battalions and other assigned or attached separate companies at Corps level. To provide staff planning and coordination for the combat, combat support, and combat service support operations for all assigned and attached units. To allocate units and resources in support of chemical, biological, radiological, and nuclear (CBRN) reconnaissance, decontamination, biological detection, and smoke operations. And, to conduct civilian decontamination in response to a domestic accident or deliberate CBRN incident.

Motto
We Serve In Silence is the motto of the 464th Chemical Brigade. This motto connotes the silent, but deadly force of the weapons that the chemical corps built to combat and the silent, dirty, thankless, yet life-saving job that the chemical soldier performs with the utmost expertise, dignity, and honor.

History
This unit was constituted on 20 October 1953 in the Army Reserves as the 464th Chemical Group and assigned to First United States Army. It was officially activated in New York City on 1 December 1953. It was later inactivated on 31 January 1968. On 22 February 1972, the unit was assigned to Third United States Army and activated at Orlando, Florida. The unit was transferred from Third United States Army to Second United States Army on 1 October 1983. After being reassigned back to First United States Army on June 1987, it was reorganized from the 464th Chemical Group to the 464th Chemical Brigade. And, it was relocated to Johnstown, Pennsylvania. The unit was inactivated on 16 September 2008.

Previous Commanders and Units Commanded
The following is a list of all of the commanders of this unit from 1972 until its inactivation in 2008, along with the units they commanded.

Sources

Military units and formations established in 1953
Military units and formations disestablished in 2008
Chemical brigades of the United States Army
1972 establishments in Florida